The 2020 24H Touring Car Endurance Series powered by Hankook was the fifth season of the Touring Car Endurance Series (TCES). Creventic was the organiser and promoter of the series. The races were contested with touring cars.

Calendar

Entry List

Race results
Bold indicates overall winner.

Championship standings

Drivers' Overall Continents Series

Teams' Overall Continents Series

TCR Drivers' Continents Series

TCR Teams' Continents Series

TCX Drivers' Continents Series

TCX Teams' Continents Series

TC Drivers' Continents Series

TC Teams' Continents Series

Drivers' Overall Europe Series

Teams' Overall Europe Series

TCR Drivers' Europe Series

TCR Teams' Europe Series

TCX Drivers' Europe Series

TCX Drivers' Europe Series

See also
24H Series
2020 Dubai 24 Hour

References

External links

24H TCE
24H TCE
24H TCE